Lac d'Orcières-Merlette is a lake in Orcières, Hautes-Alpes, France.

Orcieres Merlette